Stropharia hornemannii is a species of agaric fungus in the family Strophariaceae. It is found in Europe and North America, where it grows as a saprophyte on rotting conifer wood. The specific epithet hornemannii honors Danish botanist Jens Wilken Hornemann, who made the first scientifically documented collections of the species. Common names for the mushroom include luxuriant ringstalk and lacerated stropharia. It is inedible and may be poisonous.

It is similar to Stropharia ambigua.

References

Strophariaceae
Fungi described in 1818
Fungi of Europe
Fungi of North America
Inedible fungi
Taxa named by Elias Magnus Fries